Loup is a French surname and given name, which means "wolf" and is derived from the Latin "lupus". Variants in French include Leloup and Leleu. In other languages, the equivalent of Loup is Lupo in Italian, Lobo or López in Spanish, Lobo or Lopes in Portuguese, and Lupu or Lupescu in Romanian. The name Loup may refer to:

People
Aaron Loup (born 1987), American baseball player
Jean-Loup Baer (born 1936), French computer scientist
Jean-Loup Chrétien (born 1938), French air force general
Jean-Loup Felicioli (born 1960), French film maker
Jean-Loup Gailly (born 1956), French computer programmer
Jean-Loup Gervais (born 1936), French physicist
Jean-Loup Huret (born 1951), French scientist 
Jean-Loup Passek (1936-2016), French film critic
Jean-Loup Philippe (born 1936), French actor
Jean-Loup Puget (born 1947), French astrophysicist
Jean-Loup Waldspurger (born 1953), French mathematician 
Loup Verlet (born 1931), French physicist
Paul-Loup Chatin (born 1991), French racing driver
Paul-Loup Sulitzer (born 1946), French financier and writer
Pierre-Loup Bouquet (born 1987), French figure skater
Pierre-Loup Rajot (born 1958), French actor

References

Surnames of French origin
French-language surnames
French masculine given names
Surnames from nicknames